Joannicius I (died c. 1526) was Ecumenical Patriarch of Constantinople briefly in 1524–1525. He is sometimes considered an intruder.

Life
Patriarch Jeremias I, shortly after his election, travelled to Cyprus, Egypt, Sinai and Palestine. While he stayed in Jerusalem, the clergy and the notables of Constantinople, annoyed by his long absence, deposed him on April or May 1524, and elected in his place the Metropolitan of Sozopolis in Thrace, Joannicius I.

Jeremias reacted and together with the Patriarchs of Alexandria and Antioch, whom he called to Jerusalem, he excommunicated Joannicius. Even if the majority of the Holy Synod sided with Joannicius, the Sultan Suleiman the Magnificent ordered Jeremias to be re-installed on the throne, which took place in Constantinople on 24 September 1525. Joannicius returned to Thrace, where he died in the monastery of Saint John the Baptist near Sozopolis circa 1526.

Notes

1526 deaths
Year of birth unknown
16th-century Ecumenical Patriarchs of Constantinople